Syed Amjad Ali    (5 July 1907 – 5 March 1997) was a Pakistani politician and a civil servant during the British Raj era, who served as the 3rd Minister of Finance (Pakistan) from 1956 to 1958 and as Pakistan Ambassador to the United States from 1953 to 1955.

Ali was born in Lahore, the eldest son of Sir Syed Maratib Ali, a prominent Muslim businessman in the Punjab. Syed Babar Ali and Syed Wajid Ali were his younger brothers.  He had connections for diplomacy in the final days of the British colony, as he knew many prominent people in the Muslim, Hindu, Sikh and British communities.

Ali was educated at the St. Agnes Loreto Convent in Lucknow, Uttar Pradesh, followed by the Muslim High School and Government College in Lahore. After receiving his B. A. in 1927, he went to London for legal studies at the Middle Temple. While in London, he served as honorary secretary of the Muslim delegations at the First Round Table Conference in 1930–31 and for the Indian delegation at the Second Round Table Conference at the end of 1931. He returned home and worked for his father's company, A. & M. Wazir Ali. He was appointed an OBE in the 1936 Birthday Honours. and a CIE in 1944 Birthday Honours.

During the last few years of British rule, Ali worked closely with "two giants of pre-partition Punjab politics"— Fazl-i-Hussain and Sir Sikandar Hayat Khan —while sitting in the Punjab Legislative Assembly (1937–45) and the Constituent Assembly of India (1946).

After independence from India and British rule, Ali served as Pakistan's Ambassador to the United States (1953–55), Finance Minister of Pakistan (1955–58), and Pakistan's Permanent Representative to the United Nations (1964–67).

Books
The United Nations and I : 1950-1993
Glimpses
Prints & imprints
Ustad Bashir ud Din : the last master from Lahore School of Painters

References

External links
 

|-

1907 births
1997 deaths
Finance Ministers of Pakistan
Ambassadors of Pakistan to the United States
Companions of the Order of the Indian Empire
Indian Officers of the Order of the British Empire
Members of the Constituent Assembly of India
People from Lahore
Permanent Representatives of Pakistan to the United Nations
Syed Amjad
Pakistani MNAs 1955–1958
Pakistani Members of the Order of the British Empire